Earle Dukes Willey (July 21, 1889 – March 17, 1950) was an American lawyer and politician from Dover, in Kent County, Delaware. He was a member of the Republican Party, who served as U.S. Representative from Delaware.

Early life and family
Willey was born in Greenwood, Delaware. He attended the public schools and was graduated from Dickinson College in Carlisle, Pennsylvania in 1911. He also attended The George Washington University Law School in Washington, D.C. and was admitted to the Delaware Bar in 1920.

Professional and political career
Beginning as the principal of Greenwood High School from 1911 until 1915; Willey became secretary to U.S. Representative Thomas W. Miller in Washington, D.C. from 1915 until 1917 and State librarian from 1917 until 1921. Having been admitted to the Bar he was appointed deputy attorney general and prosecuting attorney for Kent County, Delaware from 1921 until 1931, Judge of the Court of Common Pleas of Kent County from 1931 until 1939, and Judge of the juvenile court of Kent and Sussex Counties from 1933 until 1939. Willey was Secretary of State from 1941 until 1943 and served as a trustee of the University of Delaware, of the Elizabeth W. Murphy School for Orphan Children, and of the State College for Colored Students.

Willey was an unsuccessful candidate for Lieutenant Governor of Delaware in 1940, being defeated by Democrat Isaac J. MacCollum. Two years later, in 1942, Willey was elected to the U.S. House of Representatives, defeating incumbent Democratic Representative Philip A. Traynor. He served in the Republican minority in the 78th Congress, and lost his bid for a second term in 1944 to his predecessor, Democrat, Philip A. Traynor. Willey served from January 3, 1943 until January 3, 1945, during the administration of U.S. President Franklin D. Roosevelt. Following his term, he resumed the practice of law in Dover.

Death and legacy
Willey died at Dover, Delaware, and is buried in the St. Johnstown Cemetery, near Greenwood, Delaware.

Almanac
Elections are held the first Tuesday after November 1. U.S. Representatives take office January 3 and have a two-year term.

References

External links
Biographical Directory of the United States Congress 
Delaware's Members of Congress

Political Graveyard

Places with more information
Delaware Historical Society; website; 505 North Market Street, Wilmington, Delaware 19801; (302) 655-7161
University of Delaware; Library website; 181 South College Avenue, Newark, Delaware 19717; (302) 831-2965
Newark Free Library 750 Library Ave., Newark, Delaware (302) 731-7550.

1889 births
1950 deaths
George Washington University Law School alumni
People from Dover, Delaware
Dickinson College alumni
Delaware lawyers
Burials in Sussex County, Delaware
Republican Party members of the United States House of Representatives from Delaware
20th-century American politicians
People from Greenwood, Delaware